Claughton is a sparse village and civil parish in the county of Lancashire in the north of England, in the Borough of Wyre. The population of the civil parish at the 2011 census was 633. It is sometimes called Claughton-on-Brock to distinguish it from another Claughton in Lancashire in the Lune valley between Lancaster and Hornby.

The village has both a Roman Catholic church (St Thomas Apostle) and a Roman Catholic primary school (St Mary's), but no Church of England presence, which is unusual for a parish in England. The nearest Church of England church is in the neighbouring parish, Barnacre-with-Bonds.

History
The parish was historically in the Amounderness Hundred. It lies between the Calder and Brock valleys. The A6 road runs through the west end of the parish, a short distance south of the town of Garstang.

Claughton is mentioned in the Domesday Book of 1086, appearing as Clactune. Later variations include Clacton, 1184; Clagton and Clahton, 1253; Claghton, 1284. The name is believed to be of Saxon origin, meaning 'farm on the hill'.

The Fitzherbert-Brockholes family have been associated with Claughton on Brock since the time of Edward II. They were regarded as recusants during and after the Reformation. The family has a large agricultural estate with 16 farms, which date back to 1395, the oldest being Manor House Farm is believed to be the 'Farm on the hill' from which the name Claughton originates. The parish had a public house, the Brockholes Arms, which closed for business in 2013. Afterwards, the building was converted into an Italian restaurant, which has also since closed for business. In 2018 the Brockholes Arms reopened as a public house.

Another old house of Claughton is Claughton Green, which was once part of the Claughton Green Estate before being bought by the Fitzherbert-Brockholes family. Adjacent to Manor House Farm, the large whitewashed house originates from the 18th century.

Education

There are multiple local primary and secondary schools available from Claughton, including: Saint Mary's RC Primary School, John Cross Church of England Primary School, Whitechapel Primary School and Calder Vale CE Primary. Secondary schools include Garstang Community Academy, Broughton High School, Our Lady's Catholic High School and Saint Cecilia's Roman Catholic Technology College. Colleges are in abundance in the area, including: Cardinal Newman College, Preston's College, Blackpool Sixth, Blackpool and Fylde, Lancaster Girls Grammar, Lancaster Royal Grammar and Myerscough College.

Universities in a twenty-mile radius include: Lancaster University, UCLan (University of Central Lancashire), University of Cumbria, Myerscough College and Blackpool and the Fylde University Centre

Geography 
The parish of Claughton lies on the northern bank of the River Brock, extending from the A6 to the foot of Bleasdale Moor, in the Borough of Wyre in Lancashire. Major roads in the parish include the A6, B6430, May Lane and Lydiate Lane.

See also
Listed buildings in Claughton, Wyre

References

External links 

Claughton Parish Portal
St Thomas Apostle church
St Mary's Catholic School
'Townships: Claughton', A History of the County of Lancaster: Volume 7 (1912), pp. 324-30
Neighbourhood Statistics for Claughton parish
Neighbourhood Statistics for Brock ward

Villages in Lancashire
Geography of the Borough of Wyre
Civil parishes in Lancashire